Scythris imperiella is a moth of the family Scythrididae. It was described by Eberhard Jäckh in 1978. It is found in France, Spain, Italy, Morocco and Turkey.

References

imperiella
Moths described in 1978